Frederick Grice (1910–1983) was a British children's author. Grice wrote 20 children's books, the best known of which is The Bonny Pit Laddie.

Biography
Born in Brandon and educated in Durham at Durham Johnston Comprehensive School, Grice read English at King's College, London (1928–1931), where he graduated with a first-class degree. He subsequently returned to Durham to complete his teacher training at the local university (1931–1932). Employed as an assistant master at A.J. Dawson School in County Durham (1934–1940), he later served in the Royal Air Force (1941–1946), leaving with the rank of Flight Lieutenant some months after the conclusion of the war.

Career
The Bonny Pit Laddie, a story of an aspirational teenage boy in a County Durham pit village, was runner-up for the 1961 Carnegie Medal. At the time of its publication working-class children's stories were notably rare. Concurrent to his writing career, Grice lectured in English at Worcester Teacher Training College. Before his death he had taken an interest in the clergyman diarist Francis Kilvert, which culminated in the publication of Francis Kilvert and his World.

For his body of work Grice received the 1977 Children's Rights Workshop Other Award.

References

1910 births
1983 deaths
British children's writers
British writers of young adult literature
Alumni of King's College London
Alumni of Hatfield College, Durham
Royal Air Force personnel of World War II